Darkhoveyn (also Romanized as Dārkhoveyn and Dārkhovīn; also known as Dār Khūyeh, Darkhwin, Daurat al Qaiwain, Dorquain, and Kūt ol ‘Abīd) is a city in Darkhoveyn Rural District, in the Central District of Shadegan County, Khuzestan Province, Iran. At the 2006 census, its population was 2,766, in 523 families.

Darkhoveyn is the site of a nuclear facility.

References 

Populated places in Shadegan County
Cities in Khuzestan Province